Trichoplites is a genus of moths in the family Geometridae.

Species
Trichoplites albimaculosa Inoue, 1978
Trichoplites cuprearia (Moore, 1868)
Trichoplites ingressa Prout, 1939
Trichoplites lateritiata (Moore, 1888)
Trichoplites latifasciaria (Leech, 1897)
Trichoplites moupinata (Poujade, 1895)
Trichoplites tryphema Prout, 1934

References
Natural History Museum Lepidoptera genus database

Larentiinae